Math Curse is a children's picture book written by Jon Scieszka and illustrated by Lane Smith.  Published in 1995 through Viking Press, the book tells the story of a student who is cursed by the manner in which mathematics is connected to everyday life. In 2009, a film based on the book was released by Weston Woods Studios, Inc.

Plot summary

The nameless student begins with a seemingly innocent statement by her math teacher: "you know, almost everything in life can be considered a math problem." The next morning, the hero finds herself thinking of the time she needs to get up along the lines of algebra. Next comes the mathematical school of probability, followed by charts and statistics. As the narrator slowly turns into a "math zombie", everything in her life is transformed into a problem. A class treat of cupcakes becomes a study in fractions, while a trip to the store turns into a problem of money. Finally, she is left painstakingly calculating how many minutes of "math madness" will be in her life now that she is a "mathematical lunatic." Her sister asks her what her problem is, and she responds, "365 days x 24 hours x 60 minutes." Finally, she collapses on her bed, and dreams that she is trapped in a blackboard-room covered in math problems. Armed with only a piece of chalk, she must escape and she manages to do just that by breaking the chalk in half, because "two halves make a whole." She escapes through this "whole", and awakens the next morning with the ability to solve any problem. Her curse is broken...until the next day, when her science teacher mentions that in life, everything can be viewed as a science experiment.

Math problems

The book is full of actual math problems (and some rather unrelated questions, such as "What does this inkblot look like?"). Readers can try to solve the problems and check their answers, which are located on the back cover of the book.

Adapted for the stage
The book was also adapted for the stage by Heath Corson and Kathleen Collins in 1997.  It was first performed at the A Red Orchid Theatre in Chicago, Illinois, in 1997, with subsequent productions at other locations. Its West Coast premiere was in 2003 at the Powerhouse Theatre of Santa Monica, California.  Directed by Collins, the cast included Kerry Lacy, Thomas Colby, Will Moran, Andrew David James, and Emily Marver.  The play met with warm reviews and succeeded with its audiences as well as local school children.

Awards

The book was critically acclaimed, winning a number of awards and accolades, including Maine's Student Favorite Book Award, the Texas Bluebonnet Award, and New Hampshire's The Great Stone Face Book Award.

American picture books
1995 children's books
Children's fiction books
Mathematics fiction books
Mathematics books